Jonathan Hughes (born 30 June 1981, in Pontypridd) is a Welsh cricketer. He is a right-handed batsman and a right-arm medium-pace bowler who played 42 first class matches for Glamorgan between 2001 and 2005. He made three first class hundreds.

References

1981 births
Living people
Welsh cricketers
Glamorgan cricketers
Wales National County cricketers